Claudia Paola Soto Figueroa (born 6 July 1993) is a Chilean professional footballer who plays as a defensive midfielder for Universidad de Chile and the Chile women's national team.

International career
Soto represented Chile at the 2010 FIFA U-17 Women's World Cup.

References 

1993 births
Living people
People from General Carrera Province
Chilean women's footballers
Women's association football midfielders
Women's association football central defenders
Colo-Colo (women) footballers
Grêmio Osasco Audax Esporte Clube players
Campeonato Brasileiro de Futebol Feminino Série A1 players
Chile women's international footballers
2019 FIFA Women's World Cup players
Chilean expatriate women's footballers
Chilean expatriate sportspeople in Brazil
Expatriate women's footballers in Brazil